Su Zhaozheng (1885, Qi'ao Island – 1929, Shanghai), early phase leader of the Communist Party of China, labour movement activist. A native of the Qi'ao Island of Xiangshan County, Guangdong Province, he became a sailor, active in Sun Yatsen's nationalist organization Tongmenghui, and took part in organizing the Sailors' Union in 1920. As its chairman he led the General 1922 seamen's strike of Hong Kong and the General Canton–Hong Kong strike in 1925. He later assumed the office of Chairman of the All-China Federation of Trade Unions, became a member of the Communist Party in 1925 and almost immediately also in its Standing Committee of the Political Bureau of the CPC's Sixth National Congress. He participated in formulating the plan of Guangzhou Uprising in 1927 and was elected President of Peasants' and Workers' Democratic Government of Guangzhou. Simultaneously, he acted as Minister of Labour in the Leftwing KMT Government of Wuhan. He died from overwork in Shanghai in 1929.

1885 births
1929 deaths
Chinese Communist Party politicians from Guangdong
Delegates to the 5th National Congress of the Chinese Communist Party
Members of the 6th Central Committee of the Chinese Communist Party
Members of the Politburo Standing Committee of the Chinese Communist Party
Politicians from Zhuhai
Republic of China politicians from Guangdong